Semyonovskaya is a rural locality (a village) in Yavengskoye Rural Settlement, Vozhegodsky District, Vologda Oblast, Russia. The population was 66 as of 2002.

Geography 
The distance to Vozhega is 32 km, to Baza is 22 km. Bucherovskaya, Korotyginskaya, Olekhovskaya, Dorkovskaya, Fedyayevskaya are the nearest rural localities.

References 

Rural localities in Vozhegodsky District